
Legg may refer to:

People
Adrian Legg, English guitar player
Andy Legg (born 1966), Welsh footballer
Barry Legg (born 1949), British former Member of Parliament
Harry G. Legg (born 1876), American amateur golfer
John Legg (politician) (born 1975), American educator and politician
John Legg (footballer), New Zealand footballer
John Legg (ornithologist) (c. 1765–1802), British ornithologist
John Wickham Legg (1843–1921), English medical doctor and theologian
Leopold George Wickham Legg (1877–1962), English academic historian, son of John Wickham Legg
Sonya Legg, British oceanographer
Stuart Legg (1910-1988), British documentary filmmaker
Thomas Legg (born 1935), British senior civil servant

Fictional characters
Harold Legg, character on the soap opera EastEnders

Places
Legg, County Antrim, a townland in County Antrim, Northern Ireland
Legg, County Fermanagh, a townland in Belleek, County Fermanagh, Northern Ireland
Legg, West Virginia, unincorporated community

Other uses
12075 Legg, an asteroid

See also
 Leg (disambiguation)
 Legge, a surname